The Titletown District, also known as the Titletown Entertainment District or simply Titletown, is a mixed-use development located on  of land adjacent to Lambeau Field in Ashwaubenon, Wisconsin. The district, which opened in 2017, was developed by the Green Bay Packers as a destination that will support tourism by providing year-round activities for local residents and tourists, gameday activities, as well as provide a local shopping and entertainment destination. , the district, which includes a  park and plaza, is anchored by a Hinterland Brewery, a Lodge Kohler hotel, a sledding hill, and a Bellin Health clinic. In November 2018, Titletown opened a seasonal ice rink and ice lounge.

History 

The Packers announced the project in August 2015, describing Titletown as "one of the most aggressive real estate developments in all of professional sports" and projecting that the first phase of construction would be complete by the beginning of the 2017 NFL season. Before the construction project broke ground, the Packers indicated that they were already looking at expanding the project to include more townhouses. Local businesses expressed cautious optimism about the potential economic impact of the new development on businesses in the rest of Green Bay. The hotel and sports medicine clinic opened in the summer of 2017, while a seasonal skating rink and the Ariens Hill tubing run opened in November of that year.

Plans for Phase 2 were announced by the Packers on October 3, 2018. The plan will add the residential and office elements to the project including up to 150 apartment building units, 70-90 townhomes available for ownership and 130,000SF of mixed-use office space above retail and restaurant space in a four to five story building. The Ashwaubenon village board unanimously approved the plan on December 18, 2018. Construction will begin in the spring of 2019, and by the summer of 2020, the office building and some of the first residences are expected to be finished. Residential developers are Titletown Development in conjunction with GK Titletown Developers, LLC. The apartment unit developers are NBBJ with Humphreys and Partners Architects serving as architect of record. The townhome architects are KTGY Architecture + Planning. Commercial Horizons will design the office building with architecture firm Performa, Inc.

See also

American Dream Meadowlands
Patriot Place

References

Green Bay Packers stadiums
Green Bay, Wisconsin
Shopping malls in Wisconsin
Neighborhoods in Wisconsin